Sakurai may refer to:


Places
 Sakurai, Nara, a city located in Nara Prefecture, Japan
 Sakurai Line, a railway line operated by West Japan Railway Company in Nara Prefecture
 Sakurai Station (Nara), a railway station in Sakurai, Nara Prefecture, Japan
 Sakurai Station (Aichi), a railway station in the city of Anjō, Aichi, Japan, operated by Meitetsu
 Sakurai Station (Osaka), a train station in Minoh, Osaka Prefecture, Japan

People
 Sakurai (surname)

Other uses
 Sakurai Prize, presented by the American Physical Society at its April annual meeting, honoring outstanding achievements in particle physics theory
Sakurai or Sakurai and Napolitano, nicknames by which the textbook Modern Quantum Mechanics is often known
 Sakurai reaction, the chemical reaction of carbon electrophiles with allylic silanes catalyzed by strong Lewis acids
 Sakurai's Object, a star in the constellation of Sagittarius

See also
 Sakura (disambiguation)